Kim Chun-hui (born 14 July 1963) is a South Korean athlete. She competed in the women's discus throw at the 1988 Summer Olympics.

References

1963 births
Living people
Athletes (track and field) at the 1988 Summer Olympics
South Korean female discus throwers
Olympic athletes of South Korea
Place of birth missing (living people)